David Harrow (born 29 June London) is a record producer, DJ, and multimedia artist living and working in Los Angeles.

Early life 
In the early 80’s, David Harrow could be found as a fledging performer in art school, various squats in London and the Warehouse Theatre in East Croydon. It was there that the young keyboardist met poet Anne Clark after one of her performances. He wrote the music and produced tracks on her next album, Changing Places, and would continue to write and produce a number of influential songs that have since been considered milestones of that musical era.

Career 
In 1982, David Harrow wrote and produced his first solo album, The Succession. He soon began performing live with Psychic TV, a psychedelic/punk video art and music group. From then on, touring extensively in Europe, performing both as a solo artist and with Anne Clark as well. In 1983 he wrote and produced music for her album Joined Up Writing, and then relocated to Berlin, where he met his lifelong friend Mike Vamp of the Märtini Brös. Harrow produced Vamp's record Desperado, and followed that up in 1984 with another 12" of his own, called No Easy Targets.

In 1985 he released Sufferhead EP with British vocalist Peter Hope and Bite the Hand that Feeds You with singer Pinkie Maclure.

His remixes of Anne Clark's tracks "Sleeper in Metropolis" and "Our Darkness" were released in Germany, and Harrow started producing for German music groups LeningradSandwich and Fougorki.

After working for six months in San Francisco at the request of seminal dance label Razormaid, as in-house musician/co-producer for acts such as Debora and Sylvester, then relocating to Holland and began working with Jah Wobble Live and recording their album Without Judgement.

In 1987 it was back to London at the height of the acid house movement, and Harrow recorded his final album with Anne Clark, Hopeless Cases. He began performing with "Rubber" Ron Elliston from Black Britain at acid house events around the UK, including the Shoom at London Bridge and Oranges at the Astoria.

The following year, Harrow started working with ONU as one of the many groups signed to the label, and began touring as ONU Soundsystem along with Barmy Army, African Headcharge, Strange Parcels, Dub Syndicate, Jesse Rae and vocalist Gary Clail. Harrow wrote recorded and co-produced tracks for artists such as Lee "Scratch" Perry, Bim Sherman and Mark Stewart, and performed worldwide with all of the above.

Harrow wrote and co-produced Clail's two big hits, "Human Nature" and "Who Pays the Piper", and in 1989 released Radio Morocco as PULSE8 on Nation Records. In 1990 Harrow remixed Depeche Mode’s "Enjoy the Silence" and Candi Staton’s "You Got the Love" to further critical acclaim.

In 1991, Harrow began working with Andrew Weatherall under the name Bloodsugar; the duo released both remixes (notably of The Orb’s "Toxygene") and original material on Audio Emissions/Sabres of Paradise and secretly under the name Deanne Day (D and A).

1992, as a producer for many artists: Caligula, Headless Chickens, ATR, Salmonella Dub

Soon Harrow was signed to Weatherall’s label Sabres of Paradise under the moniker Technova, where he released the epic 12" "Tantra," followed by the albums Tantric Steps and Transcience. That same year (1993), he performed a legendary party at the London club Blood Sugar, complete with naked dancers, fire eaters and body modification artists. Harrow also found time to collaborate with performance artist Ron Athey and throughout 1994 was still touring widely with ONU Soundsystem.

In 1995, Harrow wrote Billie Ray Martin's worldwide hit, "Your Loving Arms", and began secretly working under the names "James Hardway" and "Magnetic". The following year, he released the first record as "James Hardway", Wider Deeper Smoother Shit, and began touring nonstop as "James Hardway", which he would continue to do for the next four years.

In 1997 Harrow signed to U.S. label Shadow Records as Magnetic, and in 1998 he released Hardway albums Welcome to the Neon Lounge on Hydrogen Dukebox and Easy Is a Four Letter Word on Shadow Records. The album "A Positive Sweat" followed on label Recordings of Substance in 1999.

In 2000, Harrow relocated to Havana, Cuba and Kingston, Jamaica to begin work on the album Moors and Christians (Hydrogen Dukebox). A total departure from the jazzy drum and bass of his previous release, this new endeavor saw Harrow recording Santerían priests calling the Orishas to life as well as legendary vocalists such as Congo Ashanti Roy.

In 2001, after the death of his close friend Bim Sherman, Harrow headed back to the West Coast of the United States, this time landing in Los Angeles. He soon released Straight from the Fridge as James Hardway, and began building a brand new studio for his new label Workhouse. In 2003 Harrow began scoring music for television and film, including Las Vegas, Sex Lives in LA and The Loaner, and in 2005 Harrow signed to Lunaticworks and released Over Easy as the James Hardway Collective.

In 2006, Harrow established the online label "Workhouse Digital", initially to release his back catalogue. Workhouse soon became a showcase for his new recordings and fresh collaborations.

Still in demand as a collaborator, in 2007 Harrow produced Salmonella Dub's album Heal Me for Virgin Records. Harrow and rapper Lord Zen from LA crew The Visionaries worked together to become LVX Collective; the duo released 50.50.10 on Pressure Sound Records later that year. Turning the other direction, Harrow released Frozen Poetry, an ambient experimental work released under the name "Numb and Number".

In 2008, he released LA Instrumental as "James Hardway" on Ubiquity Records, followed by Wolf in the Machine on his own Workhouse label with Mirai Kawashima in a collaboration known as Kotodama Network. The following year, Harrow released the second LVX Collective album, LVXDeluxe, as well as the last "James Hardway" album Snake Eyes (Workhouse).

After his visual projection work at a UCLA’s Summer Nights at Hammer Museum party lead to a large crowd response, Harrow began branching further into multimedia work and the new and exciting realm of video mapping. OICHO.tv was born, a form of spatial media, video mapping projects mutating images, shining hallucinations and brilliant displays of color for a thrilling multidimensional experience of digital art. Not only a moniker for the visual realm, Harrow has also released several albums and EPs as Oicho.

2010 Harrow really began to revisit his early analogue Electronic roots. with a return to modular electronic music construction at his WORKHOUSE studio in East Los Angeles. Performing live beat heavy modular Dub sets at the now defunct Low End Theory as well as more improvised ambient settings outside by the LA river for modular-on-the-spot collective. More recent performances include a modular electronic version of Terry Reilly's in the human resource centre/UCLA accompanying Ron Athey at the Hammer Museum, and live ambient music and theremin at the Broad Museum

In 2015 he started Teaching electronic music production and sound design at Point Blanks LA music school and continuing to perform, produce and release music, via Bandcamp and his own label Workhousedigital.

In 2020, Harrow studied for three years at Middlesex, University of London and graduated in 2020 with a first-class BA honours degree in Music production.

Discography

[As DAVID HARROW]

ALBUMS:
The Succession							(Himalaya)				1983
Technova								(Addiction Records)			1994
A Darker Frame								(Workhouse)				2014 

SINGLES/EP:
Our Little Girl 							                (Red Flame) 	        	1983
No Easy Targets 							        (Ink Records) 			1984
Sleeper in Metropolis (with Anne Clark)				(Ink Records) 			1985
Sufferhead EP (with Peter Hope) 					(Ink Records) 			1985
Bite the Hand that Feeds You (with Pinkie Maclure)		(Ink Records)			1985

[With Anne Clark]

Changing Places							(Red Flame)				1984
Joined Up & Writing							(Red Flame)				1984
Sleeper in Metropolis						(Ink Records)		  	        1984
Our Darkness							        (Red Flame)				1985
Pressure Points							(Red Flame & Virgin)		1985
Wallies								        (10 Records)				1985
Sleeper in Metropolis						(Ink Records)			        1987
Wallies								        (Ink Records)			        1988
Hope Road								(Ink Records)			        1991

[As JAMES HARDWAY]

ALBUMS:

Deeper, Wider, Smoother Shit 			 		(Recordings of Substance) 	1996
Welcome to the Neon Lounge 					(Recordings of Substance) 	1997
Welcome to the Neon Lounge / All You Can Eat 	(Recordings of Substance) 	1997
Reshuffle and Spin Again						(Recordings of Substance) 	1998
Easy is a Four Letter Word					(Shadow Records) 			1998
A Positive Sweat							(Recordings of Substance) 	1999
Moors + Christians							(Hydrogen Dukebox)		2000
Straight From the Fridge						(Hydrogen Dukebox)		2001
Big Casino								(Hydrogen Dukebox)		2003
L.A. Instrumental							(Ubiquity)	                                2008
Snake Eyes								(Workhouse)				2009

SINGLES/EP:

Cool Jazz Motherfucker EP					(Recordings of Substance)		1996 
Bastard Son of Swing						(Recordings of Substance)		1996
Theo Steps In							        (Recordings of Substance)		1997
Illustrated Man							(Recordings of Substance)		1997
Grow / Sleep Tonight						(Recordings of Substance)		1998
Grow The Remixes							(StreetBeat Records)		                1999
Go On - Single							(Recordings of Substance)		1999
Choco Blanco							        (Hydrogen Dukebox)		        2000
Movin’ On								(Hydrogen Dukebox)		        2000
Pranksters Present: Infused 12 (w/Ian O’Brien)	(Hydrogen Dukebox)		        2001
Speak Softly								(Hydrogen Dukebox)		        2002
Feel in Love								(Hydrogen Dukebox)		        2003

[As TECHNOVA]

ALBUMS:

Tantric Steps								(Sabres of Paradise)		1994
Transcience								(Sabres of Paradise)		1995
Dirty Secrets								(Hydrogen Dukebox)	2002 
Electrosexual							        (Hydrogen Dukebox)	2004 

SINGLES:

Tantra									(Sabres of Paradise)		1994
Transcience Remixes						(Emissions Audio Output)	1995
Boxinglove								(Hydrogen Dukebox)	2002
I Could Have Sex							(Hydrogen Dukebox)	2004
Sing and Play Joy Division (with A1 People)		(Hydrogen Dukebox)	2004
Prozak								        (Workhouse)		        2009

[As MAGNETIC]

ALBUMS:

A La Magnetica						(Recordings of Substance)	1998
Fastlife								(Shadow Records)			2000
Lo Culture							(Shadow Records)			2002

SINGLES:

Bull Roaring / Cheap Detective			(Recordings of Substance)		1998

[As HIGH STEPPER]

SINGLE:

Liebeziet / Step Up					(Save the Vinyl)			1996

[As OICHO]

ALBUMS:

Universal Hum							(Workhouse)				2009
Downtime								(Workhouse)				2010
Scent								(Workhouse)				2011

EP:

Oicho								(Workhouse)				2009
Yeah What							(Workhouse)				2010

REMIXES:

The Crackdown (Billie Rae Martin) - Oicho Remix		(Disco Activisto)			2010

References

External links
workhouse.us
oicho

British multimedia artists
English record producers